Lapérouse is a restaurant located at 51 Quai des Grands Augustins in 6th arrondissement of Paris, France. Established in 1766, the restaurant was awarded the prestigious 3 Michelin stars between 1933 and 1968, although it was briefly 2 stars from 1949 to 1951.

See also
List of Michelin starred restaurants

References

External links
Official site

Restaurants in Paris
Michelin Guide starred restaurants in France
Restaurants established in 1766
Buildings and structures in the 6th arrondissement of Paris